The Whodlums are a tribute band to The Who based in North East England. Endorsed by The Who's lead singer Roger Daltrey, the band often perform in aid of the Teenage Cancer Trust, of which Daltrey is patron. As of June 2012, the band had raised £20,000 for the Trust.

In addition to playing in small venues around North East England, they have headlined at the O2 Academy Newcastle three times, first in September 2010, again in December 2012 then most recently in October 2014. All three concerts were to support the Teenage Cancer Trust's units at the Great North Children's Hospital at the Royal Victoria Infirmary, and Freeman Hospital in Newcastle upon Tyne. In 2011, they performed at Langford Live, a benefit concert at Langford Court in South West England, with Ocean Colour Scene.

Members
John Fletcher (lead vocal, harmonica)
Pete Bell (guitar, backing vocals)
Andy Dunn (bass, backing vocals)
Steve Smith (drums)

References

External links

English rock music groups
Tribute bands
Musical groups established in 2006
Musical groups from Newcastle upon Tyne